North Sandy Pond, also known as North Pond, is a lake located west of Sandy Creek, New York. Fish species present in the lake are yellow perch, bluegill, northern pike, steelhead, smallmouth bass, silver bass, rock bass, largemouth bass, walleye, and black bullhead. There are fee launches at Skinner Creek and Lindsey Creek off County Route 3 on the east shore.

References

Lakes of Jefferson County, New York
Lakes of Oswego County, New York
Lakes of New York (state)